The Center for Climate and Life is a multidisciplinary climate science research initiative based at Lamont–Doherty Earth Observatory (LDEO), a research unit of Columbia University. Center research focuses on how climate change affects access to basic resources such as food, water, shelter and energy. The Center's founder and director is Peter B. de Menocal, a paleoclimatologist and Columbia University Dean of Science in the Faculty of Arts and Sciences.

Mission 
“The Center for Climate and Life empowers the most innovative thinkers to generate new knowledge to understand how climate change impacts life’s essential resources — food, water, and shelter — and to develop sustainable energy solutions.”

History 
Columbia University provided the Center for Climate and Life an initial budget $3.1 million for its first five years of operation.

Funding model 
The Center aims to engage corporate philanthropists to support its research initiatives. Through private funding and partnerships, it aims to build an endowment, which will be used to distribute annual grants to Center scientists.

In April 2016, the Center for Climate and Life partnered with the World Surf League (WSL). The philanthropic arm of the organization, WSL PURE, contributed $1.5 million to the Center to fund five research projects on the topics of ocean health and ecosystems, ocean acidification, sea-level rise, and the role the oceans play in climate change.

Areas of emphasis 
Center for Climate and Life initiatives focus on five areas:
 Food security
 Water availability
 Shelter
 Sustainable energy solutions
 Ocean health

Research and education initiatives 
Research by Center for Climate and Life scientists is focused on understanding how climate change will affect people and the basic resources and ecosystems that sustain them. Center activities address the widening “climate innovation gap” between the increasing need for knowledge and solutions, and declining federal support for climate and solutions research.

The Center works with public and private sector partners to help stakeholders understand how climate-related impacts on essential resources will affect their bottom line and thereby guide rational business and policy decisions.

The Center supports Climate and Life Fellows, who lead research projects on topics central to its mission. In 2016, the Center administered its first two grants to early career scientists: hydrologist Michael Puma of Columbia University's Center for Climate Systems Research and NASA’s Goddard Institute for Space Studies received a $190,000 grant to study the impact of climate change on global food systems, and bioclimatologist A. Park Williams of LDEO received a grant of $180,000 for his research on historical drought and fire cycles.

Peter de Menocal, the Center director, seeks to encourage climate action by talking about climate change in terms of how it will impact human sustainability.

See also 
 Lamont–Doherty Earth Observatory, a research unit of Columbia University and location of the Center for Climate and Life.
 Wet-bulb conditions

References

External links 
 Center for Climate and Life website

Columbia University research institutes
Columbia University
Research
Climate change organizations based in the United States